Ocean View may refer to:

Places
Ocean View, New Zealand, New Zealand
Ocean View, Cape Town, South Africa

Australia
Ocean View, Queensland
Torquay, Tasmania
Ocean View, Victoria

United States
Albany, California, previously named Ocean View
West Berkeley, Berkeley, California, previously named Ocean View
Ocean View, San Francisco, California, a neighborhood
Ocean View, Delaware
Ocean View, New Jersey
Ocean View (Norfolk), a neighborhood in Norfolk, Virginia
Ocean View, Hawaii

Other uses
Ocean View (Vietnam), a U.S. Marine Corps observation post in South Vietnam during the Vietnam War
 Ocean View Amusement Park, a former amusement in Norfolk, Virginia (USA)
Ocean View High School, in Huntington Beach, California (USA)
 Ocean View Line, San Francisco, California (USA)
Zanzibar Ocean View F.C., a football club in Tanzania

See also